Highway M17 is a Ukrainian international highway (M-highway) connecting Kherson to the Russian border over the Kerch Strait, where it continues into Russia as the A290. The M17 is part of European route E97.

Since 2014 annexation of Crimea by Russia, a part of the road located on the peninsula is de facto operated by Russia, which designated that portion of the highway as two regional routes of the Republic of Crimea: 35A-001 north of the Krasnoperekopsk, and 35K-001 south of that town. The Tavrida Highway is partially concurrent with 35A-001.

Main route

Main route and connections to/intersections with other highways in Ukraine.

Gallery

See also

 Roads in Ukraine
 Ukraine Highways
 International E-road network
 Pan-European corridors

References

External links
 International Roads in Ukraine in Russian
 European Roads in Russian

Roads in Crimea
Transport of Feodosia
Roads in Kherson Oblast